Hardy Perennials and Old Fashioned Flowers — Describing the Most Desirable Plants, for Borders, Rockeries, and Shrubberies is a horticulture and gardening book by John Wood, published in 1884 in London by L. Upcott Gill. The book consists of descriptions of common British flowers, organized alphabetically by their scientific name. The first volume was released in April 1883. The book was put online by the Project Gutenberg Literary Archive Foundation in 2006.

A review in Nature was lukewarm, expressing reservations about the bulk, cost, and spelling mistakes of the work. The Athenaeum was more positive, excusing mistakes because "the book has no pretensions to be a scientific treatise." The Saturday Review also praised it as a detailed and practical gardening book.

References

1884 non-fiction books
Botany handbooks and guides
Gardening books